The Everlasting Tour is the seventh headlining concert tour by American recording artist, Martina McBride. The tour supports the singer's twelfth studio album, Everlasting (2014). The tour mainly visited North America, playing over 100 shows in the United States and Canada.

Setlist
The following setlist was obtained from the concert held on February 12, 2015, at the Adler Theatre in Davenport, Iowa. It does not represent all concerts for the duration of the tour.
"When God-Fearin' Women Get the Blues"
"Wild Angels"
"Wild Night"
"Suspicious Minds"
"Valentine"
"Blessed"
"I'm Gonna Love You Through It"
"My Babe"
"Perfect"
"In My Daughter's Eyes"
"Little Bit of Rain"
"Anyway"
"Come See About Me
"In The Basement"
"Bring It On Home to Me"
"Whatever You Say" / "Where Would You Be"
"Love's the Only House"
"A Broken Wing"
"What Becomes of the Brokenhearted"
Encore 
"Son of a Preacher Man"
"Baby What You Want Me to Do"
"This One's For The Girls"
"Independence Day"

Tour dates

Festivals and other miscellaneous performances

This concert was a part of the "St. Regis Big Stars, Bright Nights Concert Series"
This concert was a part of the "Greeley Stampede"
This concert was a part of "HawkFest"
This concert was a part of "FunFest"
This concert was a part of the "NatsLive Free Postgame Concert Series"
This concert was a part of the "Thunder Valley Summer Concert Series"
This concert was a part of the "End of Summer Concerts Series"
This concert was a part of the "Boggy Bayou Mullet Festival"
This concert was a part of "Rodeo Austin"
This concert was a part of the "Riverbend Festival"
This concert was a part of the "Burlington Steamboat Days"
This concert was a part of "Summerfest"
This concert was a part of the "Let Freedom Sing"
This concert was a part of the "Stanislaus County Fair"
This concert was a part of the "Toyota Concert Series"
This concert was a part of the "Santa Barbara County Fair"
This concert was a part of the "Last Chance Stampede and Fair"
This concert was a part of the "Medicine Hat Stampede"
This concert was a part of the "Mission Hill Summer Concert Series"
This concert was a part of the "Sweetwater County Fair"
This concert was a part of the "Deschutes County Fair"
This concert was a part of the "Douglas County Fair"
This concert was a part of the "Richland County Fair and Rodeo"
This concert was a part of the "Montana Fair"
This concert was a part of the "Brown County Fair"
This concert was a part of the "Knox Concert Series"
This concert was a part of "Live at the Garden Concert Series"
This concert was a part of the "Gulf Coast Jam"
This concert was a part of the "Durham Fair"
This concert was a part of the "Norsk Høstfest"

Box office score data

Personnel
 Vinnie Ciesielski – trumpet
 Shelly Fairchild – backing vocals
 Greg Foresman – electric and acoustic guitars, backing vocals
 Greg Herrington – drums
 John Hinchey – trombone
 Randy Leago – baritone saxophone, harmonica
 Jim Medlin – keyboards
 Martina McBride – lead vocals, harmonica
 Wendy Moten – backing vocals
 Shandra Penix – backing vocals
 Glenn Snow – bass guitar, backing vocals
 Tyler Summer – tenor saxophone

References

Martina McBride concert tours
2014 concert tours
2015 concert tours